Édouard Artigas (26 February 1906 – 25 February 2001) was a French fencer. He won a gold medal in the team épée event at the 1948 Summer Olympics.

References

External links
 

1906 births
2001 deaths
Fencers from Paris
French male épée fencers
Olympic fencers of France
Fencers at the 1948 Summer Olympics
Olympic gold medalists for France
Olympic medalists in fencing
Medalists at the 1948 Summer Olympics
20th-century French people